The Korean spelling alphabet (Korean: 한국어 표준 음성 기호, hangugeo pyojun eumseong giho or 한글 통화표, hangeul tonghwapyo) is a spelling alphabet for the Korean language, similar to the NATO phonetic alphabet.

The alphabet

Source 
 

Spelling alphabets
Hangul jamo